is a passenger railway station in the town of Yokoshibahikari, Chiba Japan, operated by the East Japan Railway Company (JR East).

Lines
Shiosai limited express services stop at this station.

Station layout
The station has one side platform and one island platform connected by a footbridge. The station is staffed.

Platforms

History
Yokoshiba Station opened on 1 June 1897 as a station on the Sōbu Railway for both passenger and freight operations. On 1 September 1907, the Sōbu Railway was nationalised, becoming part of the Japanese Government Railway (JGR). After World War II, the JGR became the Japanese National Railways (JNR). The station was absorbed into the JR East network upon the privatization of JNR on 1 April 1987.

Passenger statistics
In fiscal 2019, the station was used by an average of 1358 passengers daily (boarding passengers only).

Surrounding area

See also
 List of railway stations in Japan

References

External links

 JR East station information 

Railway stations in Japan opened in 1897
Railway stations in Chiba Prefecture
Sōbu Main Line
Yokoshibahikari